Bathytoma hawera is an extinct species of sea snail, a marine gastropod mollusk in the family Borsoniidae.

Distribution
This extinct marine species is endemic to New Zealand.

Description

References

 Maxwell, P.A. (2009). Cenozoic Mollusca. pp 232–254 in Gordon, D.P. (ed.) New Zealand inventory of biodiversity. Volume one. Kingdom Animalia: Radiata, Lophotrochozoa, Deuterostomia. Canterbury University Press, Christchurch.

External links
 The Lower Pliocene Beds at Hawera and at Kaawa Creek; Transactions and Proceedings of the Royal Society of New Zealand 1868-1961; Volume 70, 1940-41

hawera
Gastropods of New Zealand
Gastropods described in 1940